Wallingford Borough Police was the police force responsible for policing the borough of Wallingford in Berkshire, England until 1856.

It had been established in 1836 as a result of the Municipal Corporations Act of 1835.  Wallingford Borough Police was amalgamated into Berkshire Constabulary on 8 September 1856, when the borough authorities voluntarily agreed to let Berkshire Constabulary police the borough.  The three serving constables of the borough force at that time were discharged.

Wallingford is today policed by the successor to Berkshireshire Constabulary, Thames Valley Police.

See also
List of defunct law enforcement agencies in the United Kingdom

References

Defunct police forces of England
Constabulary